Robert Livingstone is a businessman.

Robert Livingstone may also refer to:

Bob Livingstone (1922–2013), American football player
Bobby Livingstone, Scottish footballer and manager

See also
Robert Livingston (disambiguation)